"Mambo No. 5" is an instrumental mambo and jazz dance song originally composed and recorded by Cuban musician Dámaso Pérez Prado in 1949 and released the next year.

German singer Lou Bega sampled the original for a new song released under the same name on Bega's 1999 debut album, A Little Bit of Mambo.

Lou Bega version

German singer Lou Bega recorded a cover of the song and released it in April 1999 as the first single from his debut album, A Little Bit of Mambo (1999). His version became a summer hit during 1999 in most of Europe. Later that year, it experienced success in the United Kingdom, North America, and Oceania. In France, it set a record by staying at number one for 20 weeks. The song reached number three on the US Billboard Hot 100 on 2 November 1999, giving Bega his only top-40 hit in the United States.

Critical reception
Elisabeth Vincentelli from Entertainment Weekly rated the song with an B minus, adding, "All of a sudden, mambo is hot again, and the unlikely city of Munich is on the Latin-music map. For this we have to thank the Ugandan-Italian Bega and his German producing team, who have hit pay dirt by tacking new lyrics onto an old Perez Prado song. While purists scream murder, the upbeat tune and bouncy, '80s-style synthesizers will rule weddings for months to come."

Copyright dispute
The song became the subject of a seven-year copyright trial between Prado's estate, the music publisher Peermusic, and Bega's producers. Bega had only used riffs (which by German law cannot be registered for copyright) from Prado's original and written the entire lyrics, so Bega's producers went to court in order to gain access to all the song's proceedings from Peermusic representing Prado's estate. However, after seven years the Federal Court of Justice of Germany ruled in favor of Peermusic and Prado's estate in 2008, based upon the fact that Bega's producers had sought a royalty agreement with Peermusic prior to releasing the song. Because of Bega's significant contributions to his version, the court's final ruling declared it a new song co-written by Prado and Bega.

Music video
The accompanying music video for "Mambo No. 5", directed by Joern Heitmann, features Lou Bega singing and dancing with flappers. An alternate music video aired on Disney Channel, featuring clips from various Disney films and television series, with newly recorded lyrics by Bega dealing with the featured characters.

Track listings
 CD single
 "Mambo No. 5" (radio edit) – 3:39
 "Mambo No. 5" (extended mix) – 5:14
 "Mambo No. 5" (enhanced CD-ROM video) – 3:42

 Maxi single
 "Mambo No. 5" (radio edit) – 3:39
 "Mambo No. 5" (extended mix) – 5:14
 "Mambo" (Havanna club mix) – 5:48
 "Mambo" (The Trumpet) – 6:01

 7-inch 45 rpm single
 "Mambo No. 5" (radio edit) – 3:39
 "Beauty on the TV Screen" – 4:03

Charts

Weekly charts

Year-end charts

Decade-end charts

Certifications

Release history

Bob the Builder version

On 3 September 2001, BBC Records released a novelty version of the song sung by British actor Neil Morrissey, who provided the voice of Bob for children's television show Bob the Builder. It features background vocals from Rob Rackstraw and Kate Harbour, who voiced several other characters on the show. This cover radically changed the lyrics to fit the theme of the show, making numerous references to construction, repairs and roadway maintenance, as well as the show's characters. The female names from Bega's version are also replaced with types of construction supplies and building tasks, e.g., timber, saw, waterproofing and tiling.

Chart performance
On 9 September 2001, the song debuted at number one on the UK Singles Chart, becoming Bob the Builder's second number-one single on the listing after "Can We Fix It?". In doing so, Bob became the first novelty act to top the UK chart with more than one single. Following the 11 September attacks, the song was removed from the BBC Radio 2 playlist, with the station's executive music producer Colin Martin describing the song as being "too frivolous in light of the news that was breaking". The song earned a gold certification from the British Phonographic Industry (BPI) on 12 October 2001 for shipping over 400,000 units. At the end of 2001, it was ranked as the UK's 17th-best-selling single.

In Ireland, the song first appeared on the Irish Singles Chart at number 13 on 13 September and peaked at number four the following week. It remained in the top 50 for 10 weeks in total. At the end of the year, the song came in at number 42 on Ireland's year-end chart. "Mambo No. 5" debuted at number three on the Australian Singles Chart on 4 November 2001 and reached number two on 18 November. After staying at the position for another week, the song descended the chart, spending nine more weeks in the top 50. It was Australia's 26th-most-successful hit of the year and shipped over 70,000 copies, allowing it to receive a platinum certification from the Australian Recording Industry Association (ARIA).

Track listing
 CD and maxi-CD single
 "Mambo No. 5"
 "Super Spud" (Spud's Dub)
 "Mambo No. 5" (karaoke music)
 "Mambo No. 5" (video CD-ROM)

Charts

Weekly charts

Year-end charts

Certifications

Release history

Ome Henk parody
In 1999, Dutch TV character Ome Henk took a parody of the song called "Mambo Nr 6" to number 17 on the Dutch Top 40. The lyrics referred to the medicine prescribed to him, which causes hallucinations of the girls he mentions in the song. A parody of commercials for the fictional product is also heard.

Legacy
The original recording by Pérez Prado was inducted into the Latin Grammy Hall of Fame in 2001.
This song was initially selected as the theme song of the 2000 Democratic National Convention, but this plan was scrapped due to the possibility of people associating the song with Monica Lewinsky, who had a central role in the Clinton–Lewinsky scandal, with the chorus, "A little bit of Monica in my life".
 The Lou Bega version has become associated with the England cricket team and Test cricket after it was used by UK broadcaster Channel 4 as the theme for their live coverage of England Test matches between 1999 and 2005; the music also accompanied the return of cricket to the channel during the 2021 India–England series. Having been particularly famous during the 2005 Ashes series won by England, the song is still played today by the England cricket fans, the 'Barmy Army'.

References

1949 songs
1990s fads and trends
1999 debut singles
2001 singles
Ariola Records singles
BBC Records singles
Bob the Builder songs
Dutch Top 40 number-one singles
European Hot 100 Singles number-one singles
Irish Singles Chart number-one singles
Latin Grammy Hall of Fame Award recipients
List songs
Lou Bega songs
Mambo
Number-one singles in Australia
Number-one singles in Austria
Number-one singles in the Czech Republic
Number-one singles in Denmark
Number-one singles in Finland
Number-one singles in Germany
Number-one singles in Greece
Number-one singles in Hungary
Number-one singles in Iceland
Number-one singles in Italy
Number-one singles in New Zealand
Number-one singles in Norway
Number-one singles in Scotland
Number-one singles in Spain
Number-one singles in Sweden
Number-one singles in Switzerland
Pérez Prado songs
RCA Records singles
RCA Victor singles
RPM Top Singles number-one singles
SNEP Top Singles number-one singles
Songs written by Pérez Prado
UK Independent Singles Chart number-one singles
UK Singles Chart number-one singles
Ultratop 50 Singles (Flanders) number-one singles
Ultratop 50 Singles (Wallonia) number-one singles
Universal Music Australia singles